Cima del Redentore is a mountain of Sibillini Mountains of Apennines.

Geography 
Located on a regional border, its peak reaches an elevation of 2448 mt above sea level, and links Vector and Cybil. Pilate Lake is located beneath  base.

See also
 List of Italian regions by highest point

Mountains of Marche
Mountains of Umbria
Highest points of Italian regions
Two-thousanders of Italy
Mountains of the Apennines